The Trifield process is a form of audio rendering in which a 
conventional two-channel signal is decoded (using Ambisonic 
principles) to an additional number of loudspeakers, typically three in 
the form of a Left-Centre-Right front stage. The technique provides 
significant additional image stability, especially when the listener 
is moving or off-axis.

It was developed by Dr Geoffrey Barton, a major figure in the "second 
wave" of original Ambisonics development, and Michael Gerzon.  It 
should not to be confused with a Yamaha system with a similar name.

Trifield also has applications in conventional surround mixing. There are 
several problems involved in mixing with an additional centre front channel 
for many engineers. The channel itself was originally designed for dialogue 
in matrix cinema surround systems and does not have a direct application in 
music mixing, where a 2-speaker stereo stage is generally, and traditionally, 
employed.

Many studio engineers with a background in conventional stereo music mixing 
find that simple panning of a source to the centre-front (CF) channel makes 
it fail to blend in with the stereo mix. However, if the CF channel is left 
silent, consumers may believe there is a fault with the disc or with their 
equipment. A way around this problem is offered by Trifield. The processor 
typically takes a 2-channel L-R signal and renders it for L-C-R, and no 
signals are sent to the CF except for those generated by the Trifield 
processor. Not only does CF content now blend with the mix: in addition, 
the resulting soundstage is more stable and listener-position independent, 
while the listener can confirm that something is actually emerging from 
their centre-front loudspeaker.

See also 

 Ambisonics
 Meridian Audio, Ltd., who include the technique in their surround processors
 Stereophonic sound

Further reading

External links 

 Trifield Productions, who own the patent for the technique
 AGM Digital Arts GmbH, a licensed manufacturer of both hardware and software implementations (called TSS and ESsEX) 
  (An article discussing the Trifield technique.)

Sound production technology